Mont-Organisé is a commune in the Ouanaminthe Arrondissement, in the Nord-Est department of Haiti. It has 17,189 inhabitants.

Communal Sections 
The commune consists of two communal sections, namely:
 Savanette, urban and rural, containing the town of Mont-Organisé
 Bois Poux, rural

References

Populated places in Nord-Est (department)
Communes of Haiti